James Robert Coffin (born October 7, 1942 in Anaheim, California) is an American politician.

He was a Las Vegas city councilman, representing the city's east side in Ward 3 from 2011 to 2019. He was a Democratic member of the Nevada Senate, representing Clark County District 10 from 1987-2011 and a member of the Nevada Assembly from 1983 through 1985. In 1990, he worked as an international observer at the Nicaraguan elections.

Coffin is Mexican American. He and his wife Mary have two children. He also has one son from his first marriage.

Coffin graduated from the University of Nevada, Las Vegas with a BS in Accounting/Business Administration.

References

External links
Nevada State Legislature - Senator Bob Coffin official government website
Project Vote Smart - Senator James R. 'Bob' Coffin (NV) profile
Follow the Money - Bob Coffin
2006 2004 2002 2000 1998 1994 1990 campaign contributions

Democratic Party members of the Nevada Assembly
Democratic Party Nevada state senators
1942 births
Living people
People from Anaheim, California
University of Nevada, Las Vegas alumni
Businesspeople from Nevada
Las Vegas City Council members
American politicians of Mexican descent